Kilian Jakob (born 25 January 1998) is a German professional footballer who plays as a left-back for  club Erzgebirge Aue.

Club career
On 19 December 2022, Jakob signed a contract with Erzgebirge Aue, effective on 1 January 2023.

References

Living people
1998 births
People from Bad Neuenahr-Ahrweiler
Footballers from Rhineland-Palatinate
German footballers
Association football fullbacks
Germany youth international footballers
TSV 1860 Munich players
TSV 1860 Munich II players
FC Augsburg players
FC Augsburg II players
Türkgücü München players
Karlsruher SC players
FC Erzgebirge Aue players
Bundesliga players
2. Bundesliga players
3. Liga players
Regionalliga players